Justice Lumpkin may refer to:

Alva M. Lumpkin, acting associate justice of the South Carolina Supreme Court
Joseph H. Lumpkin II, associate justice of the Supreme Court of Georgia
Joseph Henry Lumpkin, chief justice of the Supreme Court of Georgia
Samuel Lumpkin (judge), associate justice of the Supreme Court of Georgia